Geetanjali Mishra is an Indian actress who appears in Hindi television. She is known for her work in Crime Patrol,  Kundali Bhagya, Balika Vadhu, Naagin, Rangrasiya, Savdhan India, Aghori. In 2020, Mishra starred in Anurag Basu's film Ludo.

Career 
Despite working in various television shows as important characters, she rose to fame for her numerous characters in Crime Patrol.

In 2018, she played the roles of Rani Lakshmi in Prithvi Vallabh and Amrita in Naagin 3.

In 2019, she starred in Aghori as Dravya.

In 2020, she starred in Anurag Basu's film Ludo, and ZEE5's Abhay Season 2. She also made a cameo appearance in Kartik Purnima, during the same year. She portrayed Mahira's mother, Ramona Khanna in Kundali Bhagya

In 2021, Geetanjali Mishra explored a new horizon in the form of a music video "Dunaali" with MD Desi Rockstar.

In 2022, Geetanjali again featured as main lead in another music video "Jodi" with MD Desi Rockstar, which was produced by Celeb Connex.

Also, she took a break from television to try her hands in OTT via short films and web series.

Awards 
Best actress for a short film - Living Idle.

Television

Crime TV Series

Filmography

External links

References 

Living people
Indian actresses
Actresses in Hindi television
Actresses in Hindi cinema
Year of birth missing (living people)